Catherine Dufour (born 1966) is a French science fiction and fantasy writer.

Selected works

Novels
Dufour's books include:
 Quand les dieux buvaient
Blanche Neige et les lance-missiles ( 2002)
L'Ivresse des providers (2001)
Merlin l'Ange Chanteur (2003)
L'immortalité moins six minutes (2007)
Blanche Neige et les lance-missiles (Republishing and rewriting of the two first tomes in one paperback)
Blanche Neige contre Merlin l'enchanteur (Republishing and rewriting of the last two tomes in one paperback)
Le Goût de l'immortalité ( 2006, Prix Rosny-Aîné 2006,  2006, Grand Prix de l'Imaginaire 2007)
Délires d'Orphée (2007)
L'accroissement mathématique du plaisir (2008)
Outrage et rébellion (2009)
L'Histoire de France pour ceux qui n'aiment pas ça (2012)
Le Guide des métiers pour les petites filles qui ne veulent pas finir princesses (2014)
La vie sexuelle de Lorenzaccio (2014)
Danse avec les lutins (2019); winner of 2020  and Prix Bob-Morane

Short story
 L'immaculée conception (Grand Prix de l'Imaginaire 2008)

References

External links
Home page (in French)

1966 births
Living people
French science fiction writers
French fantasy writers
Women science fiction and fantasy writers
French women novelists